Sawtelle  is a district in the Westside of the city of Los Angeles, California, partially within the West Los Angeles subregion. It was established in 1899 and named after a manager of the Pacific Land Company who was initially responsible for its development and promotion.

Sawtelle is noted for its thriving Japanese American community, busy restaurants and arthouse movie theaters. It has strong roots in Japanese-American history. In recognition of its historical heritage, the area was designated Sawtelle Japantown in 2015.

History

Early history 
In 1896, the Pacific Land Company purchased a  tract, which lay just south of the veterans home, and hired S. H. Taft to develop a new town named Barrett, after Andrew W. Barrett, local manager of the veterans home. When the Pacific Land Company attempted to secure a post office for the new town, the postal authorities objected to the name "Barrett" on account of its similarity to Bassett, California. In 1899, the name of the town was formally changed to Sawtelle (for W. E. Sawtelle, who succeeded Taft as manager of the Pacific Land Company).

The Pacific Branch of the National Home for Disabled Volunteer Soldiers served as an attraction for both tourists and local real estate speculators. In 1906, the Pacific Branch became a stop on the Los Angeles Pacific Railroad's “Balloon Route”, a popular tour of local attractions conducted by an entrepreneur who escorted tourists via a rented streetcar, often from downtown Los Angeles to the ocean and back. In 1905, residential lots and larger tracts in the new Westgate Subdivision, which joined “the beautiful Soldier’s Home”, and which were owned and promoted by Jones and Baker’s Santa Monica Land and Water Company, were for sale. The new community of Sawtelle developed around the Pacific Branch when veterans’ families, as well as veterans themselves who were drawing relief, settled there. Most of Sawtelle thus grew up after the veterans home was established.

Sawtelle existed as a separate city until 1922. According to the Los Angeles Times, the following events took place:

Interwar period (1930s to 1950s) 
Sawtelle is steeped in Japanese American history. Within Sawtelle lies a Japanese American community and business district along Sawtelle Boulevard, between Santa Monica and Olympic Boulevards. These are remnants of a larger Japanese American presence in the area before the population was disrupted by World War II, when many were displaced by Japanese-American internment.

The 1950s through the present day 

There is some gang activity within the area, but it has decreased considerably since the early 2000s. The Sotel 13 gang has claimed Stoner Park and its surrounding community as its territory since the 1950s, and as of 2012 gang graffiti could still be found throughout the neighborhood.

Geography

The name Sawtelle may refer to a larger district that is part of Los Angeles, a smaller unincorporated area of Los Angeles County that by definition is not part of the city of Los Angeles, or a combination of these, sometimes known as the Sawtelle area. The name has also been used to refer only to the Veterans Administration complex, including the modern hospital (West Los Angeles Medical Center) and north of Wilshire Boulevard, the former site of the historical Sawtelle Veterans Home and outbuildings.

The incorporated area of Sawtelle, to the south of the unincorporated area, includes the Sawtelle neighborhood, a  district of Los Angeles. It is roughly bounded by the Interstate 405 freeway to the east, National Boulevard to the south, Centinela Avenue to the west, and Bringham Avenue, San Vicente Boulevard, and the V.A. grounds on the north. Greater Los Angeles Health Center is in the unincorporated area. The district was once an independent municipality, but was consolidated with Los Angeles in 1922. Because the incorporated Sawtelle area now represents the northern part of West Los Angeles, it is bounded on the north by Brentwood and Westwood, which bound West Los Angeles. To the south is the rest of West Los Angeles, which is not considered part of the Sawtelle district.

On the south, the unincorporated area abuts the Sawtelle city district that is now part of West Los Angeles and the greater city of Los Angeles. On the north, it is bordered by Brentwood and Westwood. This unincorporated area consists of six parcels near the intersection of the San Diego Freeway and Santa Monica Boulevard, owned either by the US government or the state of California. A private utility company owns the seventh parcel. This area is under the Los Angeles County Board of Supervisors' zoning control within the Third Supervisorial District. The unincorporated area contains the Wilshire Federal Building, the Los Angeles National Cemetery for veterans, the Wadsworth VA Hospital/West Los Angeles Medical Center, the site of a former major veterans' home, and many smaller federal office buildings.

The entire Sawtelle area includes portions of ZIP Codes 90049, 90064, and 90025 and all of ZIP Code 90073 (a P.O. ZIP Code within the 90025 area, used exclusively by the West Los Angeles Medical Center/Veterans Affairs Wadsworth Medical Hospital).

Transportation
The area is now served by Los Angeles Metro buses, but as with a great deal of the Westside much of the bus service is provided by the Santa Monica Big Blue Bus and the green coaches of the Culver CityBus system.

The Sawtelle neighborhood is served by the Bundy Station on the LA Metro E Line. The LA Metro D Line extension phase three is being constructed from Koreatowns Wilshire/Western station to Sawtelle with the West Los Angeles VA Medical Center as its last stop. The station is slated to open in 2027.

Sawtelle is part of LA Department of Transportation's Slow Street program. By limiting car traffic and prompting drivers to slow down, the pilot program was implemented to reclaim neighborhood roads for pedestrians, joggers, children and people with disabilities. The neighborhood was rated one of Los Angeles's 10 most walkable neighborhoods in 2017.

Points of interest 
Sawtelle is home to two independent arthouse movie theaters that are important cultural institutions to greater Los Angeles's film community. The Nuart Theatre was built in 1929. It showcases domestic and foreign independent films and holds regular screenings of The Rocky Horror Show and other midnight movies. Laemmele Royal Theater, originally known as the Tivoli, was built in 1924 and is one of Southern California's last remaining single-screen theaters in daily operation.

The Village is also in Sawtelle. The iconic recording studio is the birthplace of Steely Dan's Aja, Frank Zappa's Joe's Garage, Bob Dylan's Planet Waves. Many major motion picture and television soundtracks were also recorded here, including O Brother, Where Art Thou?, Toy Story 2, Walk the Line, The X Files, Wall-E, The Shawshank Redemption. It has a famous mural on its south wall.

The Japanese Institute of Sawtelle, a cultural center for West Los Angeles's Nikkei community, is on Sawtelle's southern edge, on Corinth Avenue.

Stoner Park is a natural hub of the Sawtelle neighborhood with its attendant tennis courts, children's playground, skate plaza, seasonal outdoor pool, recreation center and Japanese garden. It is at the end of Stoner Avenue.

Education

Public Schools

Sawtelle is part of the Los Angeles Unified School District  
 

These elementary schools serve the incorporated Sawtelle area:
 Brockton Avenue School
 Nora Sterry Elementary School
 Westwood Elementary School

These middle schools serve the Sawtelle area:
Emerson Middle School
 Daniel Webster Middle School
The Sawtelle area is within the University High School attendance district.

Private Schools

 Arete Preparatory Academy
 Brawerman Elementary School
 New Horizon School
 New Roads Elementary School
 Park Century School
 Saint Sebastian School
 Southern California Montessori School
 Wildwood School

Asahi Gakuen, a weekend Japanese supplementary school system, operates its Santa Monica campus (サンタモニカ校･高等部 Santamonika-kō kōtōbu) at Daniel Webster Middle in Sawtelle. At one time all high school classes in the Asahi Gakuen system were held at the Santa Monica campus. As of 1986 students took buses from as far away as Orange County to go to the high school classes of the Santa Monica campus.  three campuses (Santa Monica, Orange, and Torrance) have high school classes.

Veterans Administration hospital, office buildings, and national cemetery

The grounds of the former Veterans Home, which was established in 1888, along with a cemetery and hospital for former soldiers and sailors, is also referred to as Sawtelle. This area, containing former hospital and apartment buildings and the historical veteran's home, and now converted to research and office space, is mostly north of Wilshire Boulevard. Since 1977, this area has formally included the Veterans Affairs (VA) Wadsworth Medical Center (now the West Los Angeles VA Medical Center), which is south of Wilshire Boulevard from the former veteran's home site (see illustration above). This major hospital serves as part of the VA Greater Los Angeles Healthcare System.
The veterans home and hospital areas are both located west of the modern Interstate 405 freeway (San Diego Freeway), which bisects this federal parcel of land. It was part of a controversial plan in the 1960s, in which the property was proposed to be exchanged for Hazard Park in Boyle Heights, which would become home to a new VA hospital. The plan was shelved after seven years because of heavy public opposition., and instead, the present West Los Angeles Medical Center was built as the new hospital, in 1977.  The Los Angeles National Cemetery, which is located east of Interstate 405, between Sepulveda Boulevard and Veteran Avenue, contains the remains of some 85,000 veterans and family members from the Mexican War to the present. The Wilshire Federal Building (photo at right, description below) is also east of the 405 freeway, immediately south of Wilshire Boulevard and the cemetery.

Wilshire Federal Building 
A major stand-alone federal office building in the area is the 19-story Wilshire Federal Building (completed 1969) at 11000 Wilshire Blvd, Westwood, Los Angeles. The federal building is the most prominent symbol of federal power in the Los Angeles area, and is thus a popular site for protests against government policies.

It includes the Federal Bureau of Investigation (FBI) Los Angeles field office.

Demographics
From the 1980 U.S. Census to the 1990 U.S. Census an increase in construction caused the population to increase by 6.7%; the addition of 692 dwelling units increased the units in Sawtelle by 10.6%. The 1990 census stated that there were 14,042 residents in Sawtelle. There was no racial majority at that time. Barbara Koh of the Los Angeles Times wrote, "The racial percentages in Sawtelle in the 1990 Census were virtually unchanged from 1980". In 1990, 48% of the residents were Non-Hispanic White, 26% were Latino or Hispanic, 23% were Asian, and 3% were Black. According to 2005 Los Angeles County government estimates, the population of the unincorporated area of Sawtelle is 634.

Public services
Los Angeles Police Department operates the West Los Angeles Community Police Station at 1663 Butler Avenue, 90025.

In fiction and popular culture

 Neal Stephenson's science fiction novel Snow Crash coins the name Fedland  for the unincorporated Sawtelle area, because in the novel it is one of the few bits of land still under the direct control of the United States government (the rest of the city having been taken over by corporations).
 Director Michel Gondry filmed part of Beck's video for "Deadweight" at the Nuart.
 Because of University High School's proximity to major Hollywood studios, it has served as a shooting location for many films and television series, including Bruce Almighty, Pineapple Express, Valentine's Day, Straight Outta Compton and Arrested Development.
 Khalid's music video "Young Dumb & Broke" and Janelle Monae's "Tightrope" were shot at University High School.
 John Waters starred in a "No Smoking" theatrical trailer projected first at the Nuart Theatre in which he advised patrons to "smoke anyway".

See also

 Sawtelle Line
 History of the Japanese in Los Angeles
 Stephen W. Cunningham—Los Angeles City Council member, 1933–41, succeeded in killing public-housing proposal for Sawtelle

References

External links

 Los Angeles City map of annexations and consolidations
 NHK World video report on change of name to Sawtelle Japantown
 

 
Neighborhoods in Los Angeles
Former municipalities in California
Japanese-American culture in California
Unincorporated communities in Los Angeles County, California
West Los Angeles
Westside (Los Angeles County)
Populated places established in 1896
1896 establishments in California
Unincorporated communities in California